"Secret Land" is a 1988 pop song by German singer Sandra. It was written by Uwe Gronau, Hubert Kemmler, Michael Cretu, Mats Björklund, Susanne Müller-Pi, Klaus Hirschburger and Michael Höing, and produced by Cretu. It is an adaptation of the 1987 Kemmler-produced song "Trenchcoat Man" recorded by the short-lived German band Fabrique, the members of which were Gronau and Höing.

"Secret Land" was released in September 1988 as the second single preceding Sandra's third studio album, Into a Secret Land. The song charted in the top 10 in Germany and Switzerland, and reached the top 20 in a number of other European countries. It was also a no. 11 and no. 13 airplay hit in Germany and Austria, respectively. It also charted on the pan-European airplay chart at no. 43 and no. 24 on the sales chart.

In 1999, a remix of the song was released on Sandra's compilation My Favourites. It was released as a single to promote the album, but only met with minor success in Germany. The track was remixed again for her 2006 compilation Reflections.

Music videos
The music video was directed by Bulle Bernd and filmed in the French region of Normandy. The clip was released on Sandra's VHS video compilation 18 Greatest Hits in 1992 as well as the 2003 DVD The Complete History.

A new music video was filmed for the 1999 remix, directed by Thomas Job, which was also released on The Complete History DVD.

Formats and track listings
 7" single (1988)
A. "Secret Land" — 4:05
B. "Into Nobody's Land" — 4:12

 12" maxi single & CD maxi single (1988)
A. "Secret Land" (Reverse Mix) — 6:44
B1. "Secret Land" (Single Version) — 4:05
B2. "Secret Land" (Dub Mix) — 3:33

 CD maxi single (1999)
"Secret Land" (Radio Edit) — 3:20
"Secret Land" (Ultra Violet Club Mix) — 5:34
"Secret Land" (La Danca Club Mix) — 6:12
"Secret Land" (Ultra Violet Radio Edit) — 3:41

Charts

References

External links
 "Secret Land" at Discogs
 The official Sandra YouTube channel

1988 singles
1988 songs
1999 singles
Sandra (singer) songs
Song recordings produced by Michael Cretu
Songs written by Hubert Kemmler
Songs written by Klaus Hirschburger
Songs written by Michael Cretu
Virgin Records singles